Mohammad Hossein Emad (born 26 August 1957 in Arak, Iran) is a contemporary Iranian sculptor.

Background
Emad was born in the Iranian city of Arak and lived there until the age of 33 before moving to the capital Tehran. He began being interested in painting at the age of five when he started copying images found in the magazines. 

He began his artistic activities with experimental painting.  He later began experimenting with sculpture and held his first exhibition at Tehran's Afrand Gallery in 1993.

Public commissions
Emad has been commissioned for a series of urban projects. Among his urban sculptures are 'Vazir', situated in Tehran's Gofteman Park, and the Beheshti Monument situated in Shahid Beheshti University in Tehran, both commissioned in 2004. He has also made three sculptures for the Dr. Hesabi Centre in the cities of Tehran, Bushehr and Arak.

Books
In 2009, Assar Art Gallery published a book entitled Mohammad Hossein Emad's sculptures on the works of the artist.

Awards
 Honorary diploma from the fifth biennial of Iran's contemporary sculpture in 2007
 Selected as the sculptor of the year at Tehran's fourth contemporary sculpture biennial in 2005
 Winner of the first prize at 'Mirror of Art' exhibition at Tehran's Bahman cultural centre in 1996

References

External links
Official site

Iranian sculptors
1957 births
Living people